The Brunner Baronetcy, of Druids Cross in the parish of Little Woolton in the County Palatine of Lancaster; of Winnington Old Hall in the parish of Winnington in the County Palatine of Chester; and of Ennismore Gardens in the parish of St Margaret's, Westminster in the County of London, is a title in the Baronetage of the United Kingdom.

It was created on 27 July 1895 for the industrialist, Liberal politician and philanthropist John Brunner. He was the second son of Reverend John Brunner, of Zürich, Switzerland. The second and third Baronets were also Liberal politicians. The fourth Baronet was a cousin of Katharine, Duchess of Kent.

Brunner baronets, of Druids Cross, Winnington Old Hall and Ennismore Gardens (1895)

Sir John Tomlinson Brunner, 1st Baronet (1842–1919)
Sir John Fowler Leece Brunner, 2nd Baronet (1865–1929)
Sir Felix John Morgan Brunner, 3rd Baronet (1897–1982)
Sir John Henry Kilian Brunner, 4th Baronet (1927–2015)
Sir Nicholas Felix Minturn Brunner, 5th Baronet (born 1960)

References

Kidd, Charles, Williamson, David (editors). Debrett's Peerage and Baronetage (1990 edition). New York: St Martin's Press, 1990.

Brunner